Big Brother 2016, also known as Big Brother 17, is the seventeenth series of the British reality television series Big Brother, hosted by Emma Willis and narrated by Marcus Bentley. The series launched on 7 June 2016 on Channel 5 in the United Kingdom and TV3 in Ireland.

Rylan Clark-Neal continued to present the spin-off show Big Brother's Bit on the Side. It was the sixth regular series and the sixteenth series of Big Brother in total to air on Channel 5 to date.

This series was the first civilian edition to launch under the new three-year contract that was announced in March 2015 which guaranteed the show remained on Channel 5 until 2018.

On 1 July 2016, it was confirmed that the series length had been cut and that the final would air at the end of July 2016. On 13 July 2016, it was confirmed the final would air on 26 July 2016 meaning that with a series length of 50 days, Big Brother 17 is the shortest ever series of Big Brother UK to air in the sixteen years of the show.

On 26 July 2016, Jason Burrill was announced as the winner of the series with Hughie Maughan finishing as the series runner-up.

Production

House extension
On 2 February 2016, a planning application to Hertsmere Borough Council first revealed that Endemol had applied to build a new extension to the house, which would be its biggest renovation to the house since it was built in 2002. The documents teased a second house with another garden, as well as a new exterior set and interview studio. The old eviction set and eye studio were both demolished following the conclusion of Celebrity Big Brother 17. It was later announced on 18 March 2016 that permission had been granted with no objection. The new outdoor set will be smaller than before, holding a capacity of just 200 compared to 470 beforehand.

Eye logo
The official eye logo for the series was released with a 3-second teaser advert airing on Channel 5 on 17 May 2016. It was then posted online by presenters Willis and Clark-Neal. The eye is split, with black on one side and white on the other with shattered, coloured glass separating them down the middle.

Departures
On 9 March 2016, it was announced that Big Brother showrunner and Initial managing director Nick Samwell-Smith was to depart from the company in May. He was later succeeded by then-Initial creative director Mirella Breda.

On 20 May 2016, it was announced that Shannon Delwiche, an executive producer, was to depart and be replaced by Rebecca Kenney-Smith, having previously been Big Brother's series editor in 2015. It was also announced that Susy Price, co-creative director of Celebrity Big Brother 17 and member of the senior production team since 2011, was also to depart, leaving Katy Manley as the sole creative director.

Teasers
On 20 May 2016, a 20-second teaser aired on Channel 5 featuring both Emma Willis and Rylan Clark-Neal, also teasing that "The game is changing". First promotional pictures were also released the same day. On 26 May 2016, an extended 30-second teaser of the original teaser was aired on Channel 5. The teaser featured Emma Willis and Rylan Clark-Neal, teasing "The game is changing", "Nothing is as it seems" and "Get ready for an unseen force".

Housemates

On 1 June 2016, it was confirmed that the series would include two houses with an official statement from Channel 5 saying: "The Housemates live in the Big Brother house but they will have no idea of the dark and ominous force that is only metres away." In The Other House, The Others will be conspiring to target and take down the Housemates as they attempt to steal their place in the Big Brother House; and secure a chance of winning the £100,000 prize fund. Neither the Housemates nor The Others are aware that some of them are already connected to each other.

12 housemates entered the Main House on Day 1, whilst 6 entered the Other House collectively known as The Others. The Houses merged on Day 13.

Among the 18 housemates is Marco Pierre White's son, Marco Pierre White Jr.

Also amongst the housemates was Andrew Tate, who after leaving the house would go on to become a controversial internet personality.

Main House and The Other House

On Day 1, Alex, Andy, Chelsea, Emma & Victoria, Evelyn, Georgina, Jackson, Jason, Lateysha, Laura, Marco and Sam moved into the Main House, whilst Andrew, Charlie, Hughie, Jayne, Natalie and Ryan moved into the Other House.
On Day 4, Alex and Jackson were chosen by The Others to evict, however this eviction was fake and they actually moved into the Other House. The public then voted for Andrew and Ryan to move into the Main House to complete a secret mission for The Others. If they pass their secret mission they will be awarded full Housemate status.
On Day 8, following the conclusion of the first shopping task, The Others were asked to choose which housemate they believed to be the biggest horror. They chose Chelsea, and as a result he lost housemate status and moved to the Other House.
On Day 9, Ryan failed his secret mission to get Laura nominated for eviction. He therefore returned to the Other House.
On Day 13, the two Houses merged after two days of competing against each other. The Main House won the task and were granted with immunity.
On Day 17, the Other House was used as a place for the Housemates to evacuate to following the Main House flooding.

Weekly summary
The main events in the Big Brother 17 house are summarised in the table below. A typical week begins with nominations, followed by the shopping task, and then the eviction of a Housemate during the live Friday episode. Evictions, tasks, and other events for a particular week are noted in order of sequence.

House flood
On Day 17, following a rainstorm, the Main House suffered a flood resulting in the evacuation of the housemates to the bedroom before being moved into the Other House. For the remainder of that day and the majority of Day 18, housemates were kept in the Other House whilst the Main House was being cleaned.

Nominations table

Notes

: Throughout the first week, "The Others" targeted housemates in the Main House by nominating them for eviction. The nominated housemate would subsequently have to nominate another housemate to join them. On Day 1, The Others targeted Laura, who nominated Lateysha. On Day 2, The Others targeted Alex, who nominated Andy. On Day 3, The Others targeted Jackson, who nominated Chelsea. On Day 4, the Others had to evict two of the six nominees – they chose Alex and Jackson, unaware of the fact that they would actually move into the Other House with them. Following this, the public voted for Andrew and Ryan to take their place in the Main House, keeping the existence of the Other House a secret.
: After entering the Main House, Andrew and Ryan were told that, in order to earn housemate status, they had to assure that one housemate of their choice were nominated for eviction by the other housemates. After Andrew was ejected, Ryan had to carry out the mission alone. The Others collectively chose Laura as their target. Ryan could not nominate and could not be nominated by the housemates, as he was a 'new housemate'.  Ryan failed the mission, and thus returned to the Other house.
: The Main House and the Other House competed in a series of tasks in order to win immunity from eviction, and sole control over nominations. On Day 13, the Main House were revealed to have won the task, and the two houses merged.
: This week was "Annihilation Week" where the Housemates were told that over the week there would be multiple evictions which they would be solely responsible for deciding. When the Housemate chosen was evicted, they left through the back door with no crowd or interview. Chelsea's eviction was determined by the housemates when they took it upon themselves to use a nominations-style approach - but as these weren't "official" nominations, they aren't listed.
: On Day 35, the housemates chose to give Andy immunity for the rest of the week. On Day 36, the Housemates were gathered in Big Brother's deliberation room and were each stood in front of a button. They were told if they pressed their button they would receive £20,000 from the prize fund, but they would have to choose one of their fellow Housemates to evict. Jason pressed the button and evicted Lateysha.
: On Day 37, the voting opened for the remaining housemates except Andy, in which the public voted to save. On Day 39 it was revealed that Laura, Ryan and Sam had received the fewest votes. Their fellow housemates then voted to evict one of the three.
: As well as finding out who was nominated, the housemates were shown who nominated them. Jackson, Jason, Jayne and Laura received the most nominations; On Day 43 during a task, Sam was given the responsibility of saving a housemate and replacing them with someone of his choice. He chose to swap Jayne with Andy.
: For the final week the public were voting for who they wanted to win, rather than to evict. A double eviction took place on Day 48 in which the two housemates with the fewest votes were evicted. They were Sam and Alex.

Ratings
Official ratings are taken from BARB.

References

External links
 
 

2016 in British television
2016 British television seasons
17
Channel 5 (British TV channel) reality television shows